Givan Werkhoven (born 27 September 1997) is a Dutch football player who plays as a forward for Excelsior '31.

Club career
He made his Eredivisie debut for Go Ahead Eagles on 14 May 2017 in a game against Sparta Rotterdam.

On 19 June 2019, Werkhoven joined Helmond Sport on a one-year deal.

References

External links
 
 

1997 births
Footballers from Deventer
Living people
Dutch footballers
Association football forwards
Go Ahead Eagles players
Helmond Sport players
Excelsior '31 players
Eredivisie players
Eerste Divisie players
Derde Divisie players